Lowenstein Sandler is a New Jersey based American law firm with additional offices in New York, Palo Alto, New Jersey, Utah, and Washington, D.C. The firm has approximately 350 attorneys and has been described as "well connected" politically within New Jersey.

History
The firm was founded in 1961 and was based in Newark, New Jersey. One of the firm's founders was Newark-born Alan V. Lowenstein who was also a leader of Newark's charter reform movement. In the early 1980s, it had 67 lawyers and a staff of 150, but moved to Roseland, New Jersey after a four-year decision-making process.

In 1994, firm attorney Faith Hochberg became the United States Attorney for the District of New Jersey. In 2003, the firm promoted African-American David L. Harris, a one-time "radical", to head its litigation department. In 2004, the firm represented creditors in the reorganization of Interstate Bakeries, the maker of Wonder bread, Twinkies, Devil Dogs; this case was considered to be one of the largest bankruptcy proceedings in the country.

The firm handles legal work relating to real estate auctions and decisions about whether a business should go public. On one occasion, attorneys tabulated stockholder votes

In 2008, the firm opened an office in Silicon Valley, California, to expand its law practice in venture capital and technology. In 2009, the firm had offices in New York City and Palo Alto, California, while maintaining its office in Roseland, New Jersey. In 2014, the firm opened its Washington, D.C., office. In 2017, Lowenstein moved its Roseland office to new facilities.

In 2018, the firm conducted an internal investigation of the Dallas Mavericks and uncovered "numerous instances of sexual harassment and other improper workplace conduct within the Mavericks organization" over the preceding two decades.

Recognitions 
In 2019, the National Law Journal ranked Lowenstein 145th in the United States based on size. The firm placed 103rd on The American Lawyer's 2022 Am Law 200 ranking. On the 2021 Global 200 survey, Lowenstein Sandler ranked as the 144th highest grossing law firm in the world.

Staff
Thirty-six of the firm's lawyers (across 11 practice areas) are listed in "Chambers USA: America's Leading Lawyers for Business."

Controversies
 In 1988, a judge ordered one Lowenstein attorney to step in to replace an ill lawyer for a reputed organized-crime leader, since Lowenstein had been involved in pre-trial work on the case. The lawyer defied the order, claiming that he couldn't do it because it would require reading a 27,000-page transcript, litigating without having established a relationship with the jury, and having to interrupt his work with five other clients. Attorney Matthew P. Boylan told the judge "I refuse" and this statement resulted in a contempt of court charge, including fines, and a running battle covered in newspapers. The contempt charge was upheld through appeals, and the firm ended up paying the fines.

 In 2000, a respected 45-member law firm broke up and 14 lawyers defected to Lowenstein Sandler. These defections led to a lawsuit against Lowenstein by the other firm's ex-partners. Lowenstein settled the case on the eve of the trial.

 Zulima V. Farber, a Lowenstein partner who became New Jersey's attorney general, resigned in 2006 after an investigation found she had acted improperly by aiding a companion during a routine traffic stop.

 In 2006, the firm agreed with a state supreme court committee decision to ban attorney advertising using the term Super Lawyer as promulgated by a local magazine.

 In 2010, Judge Ellen Koblitz of the New Jersey Superior Court found that the firm, along with co-counsel Paul, Weiss, Rifkind, Wharton & Garrison, had filed and prosecuted frivolous litigation involving Ronald Perelman's in-laws and ordered the firms to pay $1.96 million in attorneys' fees to the defendants. However, on appeal, this decision was overturned and the sanctions order reversed.

Notable lawyers and alumni
Matthew Boxer, former New Jersey State Comptroller
Zulima Farber, former New Jersey Attorney General (2006)
Faith Hochberg, former United States District Judge for the District of New Jersey (1999-2015)
Elie Honig, former assistant United States attorney
Shavar Jeffries, Newark politician 
Kei Komuro,  law clerk, husband of former Japanese princess Mako Komuro
Paul Matey, judge, U.S. Court of Appeals for the Third Circuit
Rob Menendez, member of the United States Congress, son of Senator Bob Menendez
Lewis J. Paper, author
Christopher Porrino, former Attorney General of New Jersey (2016-2018)
Ted Wells, criminal defense lawyer 
Freda L. Wolfson, Chief Judge of the United States District Court for the District of New Jersey

References

Law firms based in New Jersey
Roseland, New Jersey
Law firms established in 1961